The Department of Energy of state of Tamil Nadu is one of the Departments of Government of Tamil Nadu.

History 

 A separate Department of Energy was formed at Secretariat headed by Principal Secretary to the Government, On 1.8.93

Sub - Departments 
 Electrical Inspectorate Department

Undertakings & Bodies

Present Ministers for Energy 
v.senthil Balaji

Former Ministers for Energy 
2006 - 2011
 Arcot N. Veeraswami
2011 - 2016
 R. Viswanathan

See also 
 Government of Tamil Nadu
 Tamil Nadu Government's Departments
 Ministry of Power (India)
 Ministry of New and Renewable Energy (India)
 Department of Finance (Kerala)

References

External links
 http://www.tn.gov.in/departments/energy.html (Official Website of the Energy Department, Tamil Nadu)
 http://www.tn.gov.in (Official website of Government of Tamil Nadu)
 http://www.ebillpayment.net (Official Online Payment Portal Guide of Government of Tamil Nadu)
 https://www.tnei.tn.gov.in (Official website of Tamil Nadu Electrical Inspectorate)
 https://tnei.blogspot.com ( Archive records of Tamil Nadu Electrical Inspectorate)

1993 establishments in Tamil Nadu
Government agencies established in 1993
Tamil Nadu state government departments
Government agencies for energy (India)
Energy in Tamil Nadu